Suzie Q, Susie Q, Suzy Q or Suzi Q may refer to:

In arts and entertainment

Music
 Susie Q (born Susan Banfield), a member of rap duo Cookie Crew
 "Susie Q" (song), a 1957 song by Dale Hawkins, covered by many artists
 "Suzi Q" (Ammonia song), 1996
 Suzi Quatro (born 1950), singer and actress also known as "Suzi Q"
 "Suzi Q", the Hawkins song covered by Suzi Quatro on the 1990 album Oh, Suzi Q.
 Suzie Q (dance move), a dance step in the Big Apple, Lindy Hop, and other dances
 "Doin' the Suzie-Q", 1936 song by Lil Hardin Armstrong
 "Suzie Q", song by American rapper Skillz on the 2005 album Confessions of a Ghostwriter
 Suzy Q (group), a 1980s Canadian studio project

Other uses in arts and entertainment
 Susie Q (film), a 1995 American TV film 
 Suzie Q (manga), a fictional character from Part 2 of the Japanese manga JoJo's Bizarre Adventure: Battle Tendency
 Suzi Q. Smith (born 1979), American poet
 Suzy Q, a 1999 Dutch film starring Carice van Houten
 Susie Q, a nickname for Susan Delfino (Teri Hatcher) on the TV show Desperate Housewives

Other uses
 Suzy Q, a Hostess snack cake
 Quetiapine (Seroquel), an antipsychotic drug known as Susie-Q
 New York, Susquehanna and Western Railway (NYS&W), also known as the Susie-Q
 Sault Ste. Marie, Ontario, a nickname
 Susie-Q, a B-26 bomber flown by James Muri during the Battle of Midway

See also
 Stacey Q (born 1958), American pop singer and songwriter